The Joint Communiqué on the Establishment of Diplomatic Relations of January 1, 1979, established official relations between the United States and the People's Republic of China (commonly called "China").

Its announcement coincided with the ending of U.S. official recognition of the Republic of China (now commonly known as "Taiwan"), which was announced by President Jimmy Carter in December 1978. Carter also announced the withdrawal of all U.S. military personnel from Taiwan and the end of the Sino-American Mutual Defense Treaty signed with the ROC. However, the Taiwan Relations Act passed by the unequivocal support of US Congress (and signed by the Carter Administration) shortly thereafter continued to provide the legal framework as a US domestic law to maintain commercial, cultural, and other relations without official Government representation and without diplomatic relations of the unofficial relations in the form of the American Institute in Taiwan.

Beyond formal recognition, the communiqué reaffirms the principles agreed upon in the Shanghai Communiqué, released almost seven years earlier.

See also
 One-China policy
 Three Communiques
 Sino-American relations
 Goldwater v. Carter

References

External links

Full Text of Communiqué

1979 in the United States
1979 in China
Cold War treaties
China–United States relations
Taiwan–United States relations
Cross-Strait relations
Treaties concluded in 1979
Treaties entered into force in 1979
Treaties of the People's Republic of China
Treaties of the United States
Presidency of Jimmy Carter